Piipi Raumati Cummins (c.1862 – 9 August 1952) was a Māori tribal leader, kauri-gum dealer, storekeeper and land rights activist. She was born in Waihou, near Panguru in Northland, New Zealand on c.1862. She identified with the Te Roroa iwi.

References

1862 births
1952 deaths
New Zealand Māori activists
Te Roroa people
People from the Northland Region
New Zealand Māori traders